The United Republican Party (URP) was a political party in Kenya.

History
The party was launched by William Ruto, in conjunction with several Kenyan politicians allied to a faction of Orange Democratic Movement opposed to Raila Odinga, as their vehicle for the March 2013 general elections. The party's launch was announced after a week of meetings on 15 January 2012. In December, Ruto and the leaders of several other political parties signed a pre-election coalition deal, in which he became a running mate for Uhuru Kenyatta and URP received half the spoils of an election victory. The party subsequently joined the Jubilee Alliance, which nominated Kenyatta for the presidency. In the elections Kenyatta was elected president, whilst the URP emerged as the third-largest party in Parliament, winning 12 seats in the Senate and 76 in the National Assembly.

In 2016 the party merged into the Jubilee Party.

References

Defunct political parties in Kenya
Political parties established in 2012
2012 establishments in Kenya
Political parties disestablished in 2016
2016 disestablishments in Kenya